The 2009 MLS SuperDraft took place on January 15, 2009, in St. Louis, Missouri.  It was the tenth annual Major League Soccer SuperDraft. The first selection was owned by the expansion Seattle Sounders FC.  Unlike previous years, the SuperDraft was not followed by the Supplemental Draft due to roster changes for the 2009 season decreasing the number of developmental spaces.

Player selection 
Any player whose name is marked with an * was contracted under the Generation Adidas program.

Round one

Round one trades

Round two

Round two trades

Round three

Round three trades

Round four

Round four trades

2009 SuperDraft Trade Note 
 Real Salt Lake acquired midfielder Will Johnson from Chicago Fire in a trade on 2008-08-22. In return, Chicago was to receive a natural fourth-round 2009 selection and a second-round 2011 MLS SuperDraft selection from RSL. However, the trade also contained a clause that allowed Chicago to receive allocation money in lieu of the draft picks. Chicago chose the allocation money.

2009 Supplemental Draft Trades 
In December 2008 the league decided to cancel the Supplemental Draft, which had typically been held shortly after the annual SuperDraft. Prior to the cancellation a number of trades were made involving 2009 Supplemental Draft picks. It is unknown what compensation, if any, clubs which acquired 2009 Supplemental Draft picks in trades received in lieu of the draft picks. Announced trades involving 2009 Supplemental Draft selections include:

 Round 1, Kansas City Wizards → Colorado Rapids. 2007-08-15: Colorado Rapids acquired a first-round selection in the 2009 Supplemental Draft, a fourth-round pick (#53) in the 2009 SuperDraft, and allocation money from Kansas City Wizards in exchange for forward Herculez Gomez.
 Round 1, Real Salt Lake → Kansas City Wizards. 2007-09-14: Kansas City Wizards acquired a first-round selection in the 2009 Supplemental Draft, a third-round pick (#42) in the 2009 SuperDraft, and a portion of a player allocation from Real Salt Lake in exchange for forward Yura Movsisyan and a Youth International roster spot.
 Round 1, D.C. United → Toronto FC. 2008-04-03: Toronto FC acquired a first-round selection in the 2009 Supplemental Draft from D.C. United in exchange for defender Mike Zaher.
 Round 1, FC Dallas → Columbus Crew. 2008-07-18: Columbus Crew acquired a first-round selection in the 2009 Supplemental Draft from FC Dallas in exchange for use of an international roster spot for the remainder of the 2008 season.
 Round 1, Toronto FC → Los Angeles Galaxy. 2008-08-21: Los Angeles Galaxy acquired first-round and second-round selections in the 2009 Supplemental Draft and salary budget considerations from Toronto FC in exchange for forward Carlos Ruiz.
 Round 2, Real Salt Lake → Colorado Rapids. 2007-07-13: Colorado Rapids acquired a second-round selection in the 2009 Supplemental Draft and a first-round pick in the 2008 MLS Supplemental Draft from Real Salt Lake in exchange for defender Chris Wingert.
 Round 2, Toronto FC → Los Angeles Galaxy. 2008-08-21: Los Angeles Galaxy acquired second-round and first-round selections in the 2009 Supplemental Draft and salary budget considerations from Toronto FC in exchange for forward Carlos Ruiz.
 Round 3, Columbus Crew → Colorado Rapids. 2007-02-28: Colorado Rapids acquired a third-round pick in the 2009 Supplemental Draft and defender Tim Ward from Columbus Crew in exchange for forward Nicolás Hernández.
 Round 3, D.C. United → Houston Dynamo. 2008-03-17: Houston Dynamo acquired a third-round pick in the 2009 Supplemental Draft from D.C. United in exchange for midfielder Jeremy Barlow.
 Round 3, San Jose Earthquakes → FC Dallas. 2008-04-03: FC Dallas acquired a third-round pick in the 2009 Supplemental Draft from San Jose Earthquakes in exchange for defender Jamil Roberts.
 Round 3, Toronto FC → New York Red Bulls. 2008-09-12: New York Red Bulls acquired third-round and fourth-round picks in the 2009 Supplemental Draft from Toronto FC in exchange for defender Hunter Freeman.
 Round 4, Real Salt Lake → New York Red Bulls. 2007-02-23: New York Red Bulls acquired a fourth-round pick in the 2009 Supplemental Draft and a fourth-round pick in the 2008 MLS SuperDraft from Real Salt Lake in exchange for goalkeeper Nick Rimando.
 Round 4, New York Red Bulls → Colorado Rapids. 2007-03-23: Colorado Rapids acquired a fourth-round pick in the 2009 Supplemental Draft and a third-round pick in the 2008 MLS SuperDraft from New York Red Bulls in exchange for defender Hunter Freeman.
 Round 4, Chicago Fire → Toronto FC. 2007-04-07: Toronto FC acquired a fourth-round pick in the 2009 Supplemental Draft from Chicago Fire in exchange for goalkeeper Jon Busch.
 Round 4, San Jose Earthquakes → Los Angeles Galaxy. 2008-04-03: Los Angeles Galaxy acquired a fourth-round pick in the 2009 Supplemental Draft from San Jose Earthquakes in exchange for midfielder Matt Hatzke.
 Round 4, Toronto FC → New York Red Bulls. 2008-09-12: New York Red Bulls acquired fourth-round and third-round picks in the 2009 Supplemental Draft from Toronto FC in exchange for defender Hunter Freeman.

Notable undrafted players

Homegrown players

Others

See also 
 Draft (sports)
 Generation Adidas
 Major League Soccer
 MLS SuperDraft

References

External links 
 2009 MLS SuperDraft

Major League Soccer drafts
SuperDraft
MLS SuperDraft
2000s in St. Louis
Soccer in St. Louis
Events in St. Louis
MLS SuperDraft